James Brink (June 18, 1925 – March 12, 2017) was an American tennis player.

While at the University of Washington, Brink advanced to the NCAA semifinals in singles in 1948, and then teamed with Fred Fisher to win the NCAA doubles championship in 1949.

Also in 1949, Brink won the singles titles at the Cincinnati Open.

Brink has been inducted into the University of Washington Athletic Hall of Fame. He died from cancer in March 2017 at the age of 91.

References

External links 
 NCAA Men's Tennis Championships
 

1925 births
2017 deaths
American male tennis players
Washington Huskies men's tennis players